Bound on the Wheel is a 1915 American short silent drama film directed by Joe De Grasse and featuring Lon Chaney.  It was written by Ida May Park (De Grasse's wife), based on a story by Jules Furthman. The film is now presumed lost.

Plot 
Bound on the Wheel was a three act feature. The film is set in the east-side tenements of New York City. Elsie Jane Wilson plays the "embittered" Cora Gertz who lives in a tenement room with her parents, and Lon Chaney plays Tom Coulahan, a "drink-numbed 'good-for-nothing'" who lives on the floor below them with his alcoholic parents. Tom wants to take Cora away with him to live in a place of their own, but his parents create such a fuss that after they are married, Cora agrees to stay in the same building and live with Tom and his parents.

Soon after, Cora's parents return to live in Germany and Tom's father dies. Mrs. Coulahan and Cora are forced to take in washing, while Tom devolves into a drunken lout. When Mrs. Coulahan dies, the entire burden of the household is now on Cora's shoulders. Hans, a family friend from Germany, tells Cora that he is looking for a good investment for his life's savings. Tom plots to steal the thick bankroll Hans is carrying.

Tom tries to bully Cora into helping him steal Hans' money, but Cora warns Hans of Tom's plot. Meanwhile, a drunken Tom accidentally mistakes a bottle of poison for his booze and drinks it. Cora finds her husband dead, and she and Hans are now free to marry.

Cast
 Elsie Jane Wilson as Cora Gertz
 Lon Chaney as Tom Coulahan
 Lydia Yeamans Titus as Mrs. Coulahan (Tom's mother)
 Arthur Shirley as Hans
 George Berrell
 Lule Warrenton as Mrs. Gertz (Cora's mother)
 Thomas Webster

Reception 
"A strong drama that goes right to the point without any consideration for delicacy...This is produced very well, with much attention being paid to the atmosphere of the tenement district. Lon Chaney as the husband does some excellent character work." --- Motion Picture News

"Every moment is full of action, suspense, heart interest and thrills. A true to life drama that will hold your keenest interest from start to finish." --- Motion Picture Weekly

The Modesto Evening News described the film as a "close and accurate study of life in the poor district of a large city, and like an Ibsen drama it looks squarely at life, omitting none of the sordid details.

References

External links

1915 films
1915 drama films
1915 short films
Silent American drama films
American silent short films
American black-and-white films
Films directed by Joseph De Grasse
Lost American films
Films with screenplays by Jules Furthman
Universal Pictures short films
1915 lost films
Lost drama films
1910s American films